Bajoria is a surname. Notable people with the surname include:

Gopikishan Bajoria, MLC Maharashtra
Badri Prasad Bajoria (1925–1976), Indian social worker
Shishir Bajoria (born 1956/57), Indian politician and industrialist
Shankar Lal Bajoria of Kolkata owner of Cooch Behar Oil Mills, Gopal Collieries Ltd hailing from Ratangarh, Churu, Rajasthan.